Madia anomala is a species of flowering plant in the family Asteraceae known by the common name plumpseeded madia. It is endemic to northern California, where it can be found on hillsides in the San Francisco Bay Area and adjacent mountains and valleys.

Description
Madia anomala  is an annual herb growing 20 to 50 centimeters tall with a bristly, glandular, branching stem. The hairy, glandular leaves are several centimeters long.

The inflorescence is a cluster of flower heads. Each head is a spherical involucre of hairy phyllaries covered in knobby resin glands. It spreads at the top with several yellow ray florets a few millimeters long and black-tipped disc florets.

The fruit is a shiny black achene with no pappus.

External links
Jepson Manual Treatment
USDA Plants Profile
Photo gallery

anomala
Endemic flora of California
Flora without expected TNC conservation status